The Quitauau River is a river of Roraima state in northern Brazil.

See also
List of rivers of Roraima

References

Rivers of Roraima